The Method of Equal Shares is a proportional method of counting ballots that applies to participatory budgeting, to committee elections, and to simultaneous public decisions. It can be used when the voters vote via approval ballots, ranked ballots or cardinal ballots. It works by dividing the available budget into equal parts that are assigned to each voter. The method is only allowed to use the budget share of a voter to implement projects that the voter voted for. It then repeatedly finds projects that can be afforded using the budget shares of the supporting voters. In contexts other than participatory budgeting, the method works by equally dividing an abstract budget of "voting power".

The Method of Equal Shares is being used in a participatory budgeting program in the Polish city of Wieliczka in 2023. The program, known as Green Million (Zielony Milion), will distribute 1 million złoty to ecological projects proposed by residents of the city. It will also be used in a participatory budgeting program in the Swiss city of Aarau in 2023 (Stadtidee).

Use in academic literature 
The Method of Equal Shares was first discussed in the context of committee elections in 2019, initially under the name "Rule X". From 2022, the literature has referred to the rule as the Method of Equal Shares, particularly when referring to it in the context of participatory budgeting algorithms. The method can be described as a member of a class of voting methods called expanding approvals rules introduced earlier in 2019 by Aziz and Lee for ordinal preferences (that include approval ballots).

Motivation 
The method is an alternative to the knapsack algorithm which is used by most cities even though it is a disproportional method. For example, if 51% of the population support 10 red projects and 49% support 10 blue projects, and the money suffices only for 10 projects, the knapsack budgeting will choose the 10 red supported by the 51%, and ignore the 49% altogether. In contrast, the method of equal shares would pick 5 blue and 5 red projects.

The method guarantees proportional representation: it satisfies a strong variant of the justified representation axiom adapted to participatory budgeting. This says that a group of X% of the population will have X% of the budget spent on projects supported by the group (assuming that all members of the group have voted the same or at least similarly).

Intuitive explanation 

In the context of participatory budgeting the method assumes that the municipal budget is initially evenly distributed among the voters. Each time a project is selected its cost is divided among those voters who supported the project and who still have money. The savings of these voters are decreased accordingly. If the voters vote via approval ballots, then the cost of a selected project is distributed equally among the voters; if they vote via cardinal ballots, then the cost is distributed proportionally to the utilities the voters enjoy from the project. The rule selects the projects which can be paid this way, starting with those that minimise the voters' marginal costs per utility.

Example 1 
The following example with 100 voters and 9 projects illustrates how the rule works. In this example the total budget equals $1000, that is it allows to select five from the nine available projects. See the animated diagram below, which illustrates the behaviour of the rule.

The budget is first divided equally among the voters, thus each voters gets $10. 
Project  received most votes, and it is selected in the first round. If we divided the cost of  equally among the voters, who supported , each of them would pay . In contrast, if we selected, e.g., then the cost per voter would be . The method selects first the project that minimises the price per voter.

Note that in the last step project  was selected even though there were projects which were supported by more voters, say . On the other hand, the voters who voted for  form 20% of the population, and so shall have right to decide about 20% of the budget. Those voters supported only , and this is why this project was selected.

For a more detailed example including cardinal ballots see Example 2.

Definition 
This section presents the definition of the rule for cardinal ballots. See discussion for a discussion on how to apply this definition to approval ballots and ranked ballots.

We have a set of projects , and a set of voters . For each project  let  denote its cost, and let  denote the size of the available municipal budget.

The method of equal shares works in rounds. At the beginning it puts an equal part of the budget, in each voter's virtual bank account, . In each round the method selects one project according to the following procedure.

Example 2 

The following diagram illustrates the behaviour of the method.

Discussion 

This section provides a discussion on other variants of the method of equal shares.

Other types of ballots 

The method of equal shares can be used with other types of voters ballots.

Approval ballots 

The method can be applied in two ways to the setting where the voters vote by marking the projects they like (see Example 1): 
 Setting  if project  is approved by voter , and  otherwise. This assumes that the utility of a voter equals the total amount of money spent on the projects supported by the voter. This assumption is commonly used in other methods of counting approval ballots for participatory budgeting, for example in the knapsack algorithm, and typically results in selecting fewer more expensive projects.
 Setting  if project  is approved by voter , and  otherwise. This assumes that the utility of a voter equals the number of approved selected projects. This typically results in selecting more but less expensive projects.

Ranked ballots 

The method applies to the model where the voters vote by ranking the projects from the most to the least preferred one.

Formally, the method is defined as follows.

For each voter  let  denote the ranking of voter  over the projects.

Each voter is initially assigned an equal part of the budget . The rule proceeds in rounds, in each round:

Committee elections 

In the context of committee elections the projects are typically called candidates. It is assumed that cost of each candidate equals one; then, the budget  can be interpreted as the number of candidates in the committee that should be selected.

Unspent budget 

The method of equal shares can return a set of projects that does not exhaust the whole budget. There are multiple ways to use the unspent budget:

Comparison to other voting methods 

In the context of committee elections the method is often compared to Proportional Approval Voting (PAV), since both methods are proportional (they satisfy the axiom of Extended Justified Representation (EJR)). The difference between the two methods can be described as follow.

MES is similar to the Phragmen's sequential rule. The difference is that in MES the voters are given their budgets upfront, while in the Phragmen's sequential rule the voters earn money continuously over time. The methods compare as follows:

MES with adjusting initial budget, PAV and Phragmen's voting rules can all be viewed as extensions of the D'Hondt method to the setting where the voters can vote for individual candidates rather than for political parties. MES further extends to participatory budgeting.

Implementation 
Below there is a Python implementation of the method that applies to  participatory budgeting. For the model of committee elections, the rules is implemented as a part of the Python package abcvoting.

import math

def leq(a, b):
    return a < b or math.isclose(a, b)

# N:     a list of voters.
# C:     a list of projects (candidates).
# cost:  a dictionary that assigns each project its cost.
# b:     the total available budget.
# u:     a dictionary; u[c][i] is the value that voter i assigns to candidate c.
#        an empty entry means that the corresponding value u[c][i] equals 0.

def complete_utilitarian(N, C, cost, u, b, W):
    util = {c: sum([u[c][i] for i in N]) for c in C}
    committee_cost = sum([cost[c] for c in W])
    while True:
        next_candidate = None
        highest_util = float("-inf")
        for c in C.difference(W):
            if leq(committee_cost + cost[c], b):
                if util[c] / cost[c] > highest_util:
                    next_candidate = c
                    highest_util = util[c] / cost[c]
        if next_candidate is None:
            break
        W.add(next_candidate)
        committee_cost += cost[next_candidate]
    return W

def method_of_equal_shares(N, C, cost, u, b):
    W = set()
    total_utility = {c: sum(u[c].values()) for c in C}
    supporters = {c: set([i for i in N if u[c][i] > 0]) for c in C}
    budget = {i: b / len(N) for i in N}
    while True:
        next_candidate = None
        lowest_rho = float("inf")
        for c in C.difference(W):
            if leq(cost[c], sum([budget[i] for i in supporters[c]])):
                supporters_sorted = sorted(supporters[c], key=lambda i: budget[i] / u[c][i])
                price = cost[c]
                util = total_utility[c]
                for i in supporters_sorted:
                    if leq(price * u[c][i], budget[i] * util):
                        break
                    price -= budget[i]
                    util -= u[c][i]
                rho = price / util \
                        if not math.isclose(util, 0) and not math.isclose(price, 0) \
                        else budget[supporters_sorted[-1]] / u[c][supporters_sorted[-1]]
                if rho < lowest_rho:
                    next_candidate = c
                    lowest_rho = rho
        if next_candidate is None:
            break
        W.add(next_candidate)
        for i in N:
            budget[i] -= min(budget[i], lowest_rho * u[next_candidate][i])
    return complete_utilitarian(N, C, cost, u, b, W)  # one of the possible completions

External links 

 Website explaining and discussing the Method of Equal Shares in several languages

References 

Vote counting
Multi-winner electoral systems
Preferential electoral systems
Proportional representation electoral systems
Participatory budgeting
Cardinal electoral systems
Approval voting